Lee Heider (born February 17, 1947) is a Republican member of the Idaho Senate, first elected in 2010. Heider represents the 24th District, which contains most of the city of Twin Falls.

Early life and career 

Heider was born and raised in Twin Falls. He is married to Jan, has six children, and 22 grandchildren. He is owner of a flooring company in Twin Falls and served in the United States Air Force. Heider holds a bachelor's degree from Brigham Young University and a Master of Public Administration from Ball State University.

Previously Heider served as a member of the Twin Falls City Council and as vice mayor of Twin Falls.

Idaho Senate 
In the Idaho Senate Heider is a member of the following committees:
 Health and Welfare 
 Resources and Environment (chair)

Elections

Awards 
Eagle Scout and Silver Beaver, Boy Scouts of America

References

External links

1947 births
American people of German descent
Latter Day Saints from Idaho
Latter Day Saints from Indiana
Ball State University alumni
Brigham Young University alumni
Living people
Republican Party Idaho state senators
People from Twin Falls, Idaho
Mayors of places in Idaho
Idaho city council members
21st-century American politicians